Jennifer Lynn Armentrout (born June 11, 1980), also known by the pseudonym J. Lynn, is an American writer of contemporary romance, new adult and fantasy. Several of her works have made The New York Times Best Seller list.

She is considered a "hybrid" author, having successfully self-published while maintaining active contracts with small independent presses, and traditional publishers. Her current publishers include Spencer Hill Press, Entangled Publishing, Harlequin Teen, Disney/Hyperion, and HarperCollins.

Early life 
Jennifer L. Armentrout was born on June 11 in West Virginia. She was inspired to become a writer after reading the works of L.J. Smith, such as The Vampire Diaries, The Secret Circle Series, The Forbidden Games Series, and myriad others. The book series that remained close to her heart was The Forbidden Games, with the final novel bringing her to tears. Upon completing the series she decided she wanted to leave the same impact on her future readers.

Her first experience with writing an actual novel was in high school during algebra class. Despite her desire to be an author, she went to college and graduated with a major in psychology.

Career 
Despite receiving a great deal of rejections before her career began, Armentrout's first book was published in 2011. As of September 2019, she had fifty-three of her fifty-seven total written works published. The majority of her published works for young adults are romance, fantasy and paranormal, and some contemporary and science fiction. With her pseudonym J. Lynn, she writes suspenseful romance novels for her adult readers.

In 2013, her young adult novel Obsidian has been optioned by Sierra Pictures, but the rights were later returned to the author. In 2015,  Armentrout's colleague suggested that she do a book signing for the first release in her Titan series. She was opposed to doing a lonely and awkward book signing, so she asked authors to come join her in the daylong event. After this, Armentrout created ApollyCon, which rapidly became a new way for authors and readers to come together in celebration of recently released books. The convention's success continues to grow with each event.

Throughout her career, Armentrout continues to reach success. She is a #1 New York Times and a USA Today Best Seller. She has published books independently and with publishing companies, earning the title of being a "hybrid" author.

Personal life 
Armentrout was diagnosed with retinitis pigmentosa in 2015. She has become passionate about teaching readers about it by being representative and spreading awareness. She also enjoys being a source of support for her readers that share the same disorder.

As of 2020, Armentrout lives with her husband, her dog Apollo, and her alpacas on a farm in West Virginia.

She likes writing stories for both age groups to prevent writer burnout. Armentrout is highly prolific and states that she writes for eight hours a day almost every day. During the creative process, she likes to alternate between typing and handwriting so that she doesn't experience any writer's block.

Publications

Books written under Jennifer L. Armentrout

Covenant series 
 Daimon (novella, prequel to Half-Blood) (2011)
 Half-Blood (2011)
 Pure ( 2012)
 Deity (2012)
 Elixir (novella, prequel to Apollyon) (2012)
 Apollyon (2013)
 Sentinel (2013)

Titan Series (Spin-Off to Covenant) 
 The Return (2015)
 The Power  (2016)
 The Struggle  (2017)
 The Prophecy (2018)

Lux series 
 Shadows (novella, prequel to Obsidian) (2012)
 Obsidian (2011)
 Onyx (2012)
 Opal (2012)
 Origin (2013)
 Opposition (2014)
 Oblivion (2015)

Arum novel (Lux spin-off) 
 Obsession (2013)

Origin series (Lux spin-off) 
 The Darkest Star (2018)
 The Burning Shadow (2019)
 The Brightest Night  (2020)
 The Fevered Winter (TBA)

The Dark Elements series 
 Bitter Sweet Love (prequel novella) (2013)
 White Hot Kiss (2014)
 Stone Cold Touch (2014)
 Every Last Breath (2015)

The Harbinger series (Dark Elements spin off) 
 Storm and Fury (2019)
 Rage and Ruin (2020)
 Grace and Glory (2021)

Wicked trilogy 
 Wicked (2014)
 Torn (2016)
 Brave (2017)
 The Prince (A 1001 Dark Nights Novella) (2018)
 The King (A 1001 Dark Nights Novella)  (2019)
 The Queen (A 1001 Dark Nights Novella) (2020)

Blood and Ash series 
 From Blood And Ash (2020)
 A Kingdom of Flesh and Fire (2020)
 The Crown of Gilded Bones (2021)
 The War of Two Queens (2022)
 A Soul of Ash and Blood (2023) 
 The Primal of Blood and Bone (2024)

Flesh and Fire series (Spin Off to Blood and Ash) 
 A Shadow in the Ember (2021)
 A Light in the Flame (2022)
 A Fire in the Flesh (2023)

Blood and Ash and Flesh and Fire companion 
Visions of Flesh and Blood: A Blood and Ash/Flesh and Fire compendium (2023) ( co-written with Rayvn Salvador )

de Vincent series 
 Moonlight Sins (2018)
 Moonlight Seduction (2018)
 Moonlight Scandals (2019)

Standalone novels 
 Cursed (2012)
 Unchained- Nephilim Rising  (2013)
 Don't Look Back (2014)
 The Dead List (2015)
 The Problem with Forever (2016)
 Till Death (2017)
 If There's No Tomorrow (2017)
   Fall of Ruin and Wrath (2023)
Anthologies

 Meet Cute
 Life Inside My Mind
 Fifty First Times

Books written under her pen name J. Lynn

Gamble Brothers series 
 Tempting the Best Man (2012)
 Tempting the Player (2012)
 Tempting the Bodyguard (2014)

Wait for You series 
 Wait for You (2013)
 Trust in Me (2013)
 Be With Me (2014)
 Believe in Me (Short Story in Fifty First Times Anthology) (2014)
 The Proposal (Short Story) (2014)
 Stay With Me (2014)
 Fall With Me (2015)
 Dream of You (A 1001 Dark Nights Novella) (2015)
 Forever With You (2015)
 Fire in You (2016)

Frigid series 
 Frigid (2013)
 Scorched (2015)

References

External links 

 
 Jenner L Armentrout's Official Wattpad Profile

Living people
American women novelists
21st-century American novelists
Writers from Martinsburg, West Virginia
21st-century American women writers
1980 births